Tell-All is a novel by Chuck Palahniuk, released on May 4, 2010. It is his 11th novel. A preview video, with the tagline: "Boy Meets Girl. Boy Gets Girl. Boy Kills Girl?" was released to entice fans prior to the novel's release.

Plot summary
The novel, an homage to the Golden Age of Hollywood, is narrated by Hazel "Hazie" Coogan, a lifelong employee and caretaker of aging actress Katherine "Miss Kathie" Kenton.

When a suitor named Webster Carlton Westward III manages to weasel his way into Miss Kathie's heart (and bed), Hazie appears suspicious. Upon apparently discovering that Westward has already written a celebrity tell-all memoir foretelling Miss Kathie's death in a forthcoming Lillian Hellman–penned musical extravaganza, Hazie warns Kathie that Westward's intentions may be less than honorable, and may even be deadly.

References

2010 American novels
Novels by Chuck Palahniuk
Novels about actors
Hollywood novels
Doubleday (publisher) books
Books with cover art by Rodrigo Corral